Andrew Jess Dannenberg  (born 17 February 1956) is a U.S. physician and researcher.  In 2021 he retired as the Henry R. Erle, M.D. - Roberts Family Professor of Medicine at Weill Medical College/M.D. Anderson Cancer Center. He additionally held the positions of Professor of Medicine in Cardiothoracic surgery and Director of Cancer Prevention. He received a B.S. from Tufts University in 1978 and an M.D. from Washington University School of Medicine in 1982.

Honors 
 AACR-Prevent Cancer Foundation Award for Excellence in Cancer Prevention Research, 2011
Upjohn Achievement Award for scientific research
American Liver Foundation Scholar Award and the
International Life Sciences Research Foundation Award.

Publications 
His current work deals with  the role of cyclooxygenase-2 (COX-2) in cancer.,  He has previously been one of the three lead investigators of a major study on the role of aspirin in the prevention of breast cancer.

Retractions
On 3 January 2020, the Journal of Biological Chemistry retracted 9 publications by Dannenberg.  There is also a 2006 retraction of a 2005 paper in the Lancet.
On 1 June 2022, the Journal Cancer Prev Res (Phila) retracted 9 publications by Dannenberg.
https://aacrjournals.org/cancerpreventionresearch/issue/15/6

Withdrawals/Retractions

Withdrawal: p53 protein regulates Hsp90 ATPase activity and thereby Wnt signaling by modulating Aha1 expression.
Sachiyo Okayama, Levy Kopelovich, Gabriel Balmus, Robert S. Weiss, Brittney-Shea Herbert, Andrew J. Dannenberg, and Kotha Subbaramaiah
J. Biol. Chem. 2020 295: 289. doi:10.1074/jbc.W119.012134

Withdrawal: Hsp90 and PKM2 drive the expression of aromatase in Li-Fraumeni syndrome breast adipose stromal cells.
Kotha Subbaramaiah, Kristy A. Brown, Heba Zahid, Gabriel Balmus, Robert S. Weiss, Brittney-Shea Herbert, and Andrew J. Dannenberg
J. Biol. Chem. 2020 295: 290. doi:10.1074/jbc.W119.012135

Withdrawal: Peroxisome proliferator-activated receptor γ ligands suppress the transcriptional activation of cyclooxygenase-2: Evidence for involvement of activator protein-1 and CREB-binding protein/p300.
Kotha Subbaramaiah, Derrick T. Lin, Janice C. Hart, and Andrew J. Dannenberg
J. Biol. Chem. 2020 295: 291. doi:10.1074/jbc.W119.012136

Withdrawal: Regulation of cyclooxygenase-2 mRNA stability by taxanes: Evidence for involvement of p38, MAPKAPK-2, and HuR.
Kotha Subbaramaiah, Timothy P. Marmo, Dan A. Dixon, and Andrew J. Dannenberg
J. Biol. Chem. 2020 295: 292. doi:10.1074/jbc.W119.012137

Withdrawal: Microsomal prostaglandin E synthase-1 is overexpressed in inflammatory bowel disease: Evidence for involvement of the transcription factor Egr-1.
Kotha Subbaramaiah, Kazuhiko Yoshimatsu, Ellen Scherl, Kiron M. Das, Kenneth D. Glazier, Dragan Golijanin, Robert A. Soslow, Tadashi Tanabe, Hiroaki Naraba, and Andrew J. Dannenberg
J. Biol. Chem. 2020 295: 293. doi:10.1074/jbc.W119.012138

Withdrawal: Histone deacetylase inhibitors suppress the induction of c-Jun and its target genes including COX-2.
Kentaro Yamaguchi, Agnieszka Lantowski, Andrew J. Dannenberg, and Kotha Subbaramaiah
J. Biol. Chem. 2020 295: 294. doi:10.1074/jbc.W119.012139

Withdrawal: EP2 and EP4 receptors regulate aromatase expression in human adipocytes and breast cancer cells: Evidence of a BRCA1 and p300 exchange.
Kotha Subbaramaiah, Clifford Hudis, Sung-Hee Chang, Timothy Hla, and Andrew J. Dannenberg
J. Biol. Chem. 2020 295: 295. doi:10.1074/jbc.W119.012140

Withdrawal: Cyclooxygenase-2-derived prostaglandin E2 stimulates Id-1 transcription.
Kotha Subbaramaiah, Robert Benezra, Clifford Hudis, and Andrew J. Dannenberg
J. Biol. Chem. 2020 295: 296. doi:10.1074/jbc.W119.012141

Withdrawal: HDAC6 modulates Hsp90 chaperone activity and regulates activation of aryl hydrocarbon receptor signaling.
Vikram D. Kekatpure, Andrew J. Dannenberg, and Kotha Subbaramaiah
J. Biol. Chem. 2020 295: 297. doi:10.1074/jbc.W119.012142

Non-steroidal anti-inflammatory drugs and the risk of oral cancer: a nested case-control study. 
Sudbø J, Lee JJ, Lippman SM, Mork J, Sagen S, Flatner N, Ristimäki A, Sudbø A, Mao L, Zhou X, Kildal W, Evensen JF, Reith A, Dannenberg AJ.
Lancet. 2005 Oct 15–21;366(9494):1359-66. Retraction in: Horton R. Lancet. 2006 Feb 4;367(9508):382.

Retraction: Id1 Deficiency Protects Against Tumor Formation in ApcMin/+ Mice but not in a Mouse Model of Colitis-associated Colon Cancer 
Ning Zhang; Kotha Subbaramaiah; Rhonda K. Yantiss; Xi Kathy Zhou; Yvette Chin; Robert Benezra; Andrew J. Dannenberg

Retraction: p53 Modulates Hsp90 ATPase Activity and Regulates Aryl Hydrocarbon Receptor Signaling 
Amit Kochhar; Levy Kopelovich; Erika Sue; Joseph B. Guttenplan; Brittney-Shea Herbert; Andrew J. Dannenberg; Kotha Subbaramaiah

Retraction: Dietary Polyphenols Suppress Elevated Levels of Proinflammatory Mediators and Aromatase in the Mammary Gland of Obese Mice 
Kotha Subbaramaiah; Erika Sue; Priya Bhardwaj; Baoheng Du; Clifford A. Hudis; Dilip Giri; Levy Kopelovich; Xi Kathy Zhou; Andrew J. Dannenberg

Retraction: Caloric Restriction Reverses Obesity-Induced Mammary Gland Inflammation in Mice 
Priya Bhardwaj; Baoheng Du; Xi Kathy Zhou; Erika Sue; Michael D. Harbus; Domenick J. Falcone; Dilip Giri; Clifford A. Hudis; Levy Kopelovich; Kotha Subbaramaiah; Andrew J. Dannenberg

Retraction: Pioglitazone, a PPARγ Agonist, Suppresses CYP19 Transcription: Evidence for Involvement of 15-Hydroxyprostaglandin Dehydrogenase and BRCA1 
Kotha Subbaramaiah; Louise R. Howe; Xi Kathy Zhou; Peiying Yang; Clifford A. Hudis; Levy Kopelovich; Andrew J. Dannenberg

Retraction: Carnosol, a Constituent of Zyflamend, Inhibits Aryl Hydrocarbon Receptor-Mediated Activation of CYP1A1 and CYP1B1 Transcription and Mutagenesis 
Arash Mohebati; Joseph B. Guttenplan; Amit Kochhar; Zhong-Lin Zhao; Wieslawa Kosinska; Kotha Subbaramaiah; Andrew J. Dannenberg

Retraction: Obesity Is Associated With Inflammation and Elevated Aromatase Expression in the Mouse Mammary Gland 
Kotha Subbaramaiah; Louise R. Howe; Priya Bhardwaj; Baoheng Du; Claudia Gravaghi; Rhonda K. Yantiss; Xi Kathy Zhou; Victoria A. Blaho; Timothy Hla; Peiying Yang; Levy Kopelovich; Clifford A. Hudis; Andrew J. Dannenberg

Retraction: The Prostaglandin Transporter Regulates Adipogenesis and Aromatase Transcription 
Kotha Subbaramaiah; Clifford A. Hudis; Andrew J. Dannenberg

Retraction: HSP90 Inhibitors Suppress Aryl Hydrocarbon Receptor–Mediated Activation of CYP1A1 and CYP1B1 Transcription and DNA Adduct Formation 
Duncan Hughes; Joseph B. Guttenplan; Craig B. Marcus; Kotha Subbaramaiah; Andrew J. Dannenberg

Journals 
According to Web of Science, he has published over 200 peer-reviewed articles, of which 27 have cited over 100 times. The most cited are:
"Cyclooxygenase-2 overexpression and tumor formation are blocked by sulindac in a murine model of familial adenomatous polyposis" by  Boolbol SK, Dannenberg AJ, Chadburn A, in  Cancer Research 56(11)2556-2560 (1996) Times Cited: 401
"Cyclooxygenase-2 expression is up-regulated in human pancreatic cancer" by Tucker ON, Dannenberg AJ, Yang FK, et al. in  Cancer Research 59 (5) 987-990  (1999)Times Cited: 386
"Cyclooxygenase-2 expression is up-regulated in squamous cell carcinoma of the head and neck" by   Chan G, Boyle JO, Yang EK, et al. in  Cancer Research 59  (5) 991-994   (1999) Times Cited: 384
"COX‐2 is expressed in human pulmonary, colonic, and mammary tumors" RA Soslow, AJ Dannenberg, D Rush, BM Woerner, KN. in Cancer: 89   ( 12) 2637-2645  (2000) Times Cited: 289

Editor 
COX-2: A New Target for Cancer Prevention and Treatment  ed. by   R. N. Dubois and A. J. Dannenberg Basel ; New York : Karger, 2003. 
The role of COX-2 carcinogenesis by Andrew J Dannenberg;  Raymond N Dubois;  Steven M Dubinett;  Nasser K Altorki; et al.  Philadelphia, PA: Saunders, 2004. OCLC: 66570293
Peptic ulcer disease and other acid-related disorders by David Zakim;  Andrew J Dannenberg Armonk, N.Y. : Academic Research Associates, 1991.

References

External links 
 Andrew Jess Dannenberg - homepage at Cornell university

American thoracic surgeons
Cornell University faculty
1956 births
Living people
Tufts University alumni
Washington University School of Medicine alumni